Plagiopus is a genus of mosses belonging to the family Bartramiaceae.

The genus has cosmopolitan distribution.

Species:
 Plagiopus ithyphyllus (Brid.) Guim. 
 Plagiopus javanicus (Dozy & Molk.) M.Fleisch.

References

Bartramiales
Moss genera